Hagenbach is a surname, and may refer to:

 August Hagenbach (1871 – 1949), Swiss physicist working in spectroscopy
 Jacob Johann Hagenbach (1802? – 1825), Swiss entomologist
 Karl Rudolf Hagenbach (1801 – 1874), Swiss church theologian and historian
 Peter von Hagenbach (circa 1420 – 1474), Bourguignon knight from Alsace and Germanic military and civil commander